Coleman Classics Volume 1 is a live album by pianist Paul Bley, saxophonist Ornette Coleman, trumpeter Don Cherry, drummer Billy Higgins and bassist Charlie Haden recorded in California in 1958 and released Bley's on the Improvising Artists label in 1977. The album is an early live recording of Ornette Coleman, made shortly after his first album, Something Else!!!! and featuring the group (without Bley) that would soon record the Atlantic albums The Shape of Jazz to Come (1959) and Change of the Century (1960).

Reception

Allmusic reviewer Scott Yanow observed: "Coleman already had his very original style pretty much together at this early stage. Paul Bley was wise enough to mostly stay out of the way and he clearly benefited from this encounter with some of the pioneers of free jazz".

Track listing
All compositions by Ornette Coleman except as indicated
 "When Will The Blues Leave" - 14:06
 "Crossroads" - 2:00
 "Rambling" - 14:28
 "How Deep Is the Ocean" (Irving Berlin) - 4:40

Personnel 
Paul Bley - piano
Ornette Coleman - alto saxophone
Don Cherry - cornet
Charlie Haden - bass  
Billy Higgins - drums

References 

1977 live albums
Paul Bley live albums
Ornette Coleman live albums
Improvising Artists Records live albums